Jacky Bovay (1 April 1933 – 19 September 1984) was a Swiss professional racing cyclist. He rode in two editions of the Tour de France.

References

External links
 

1933 births
1984 deaths
Swiss male cyclists
Sportspeople from the canton of Vaud